Bmibaby Limited (styled as bmibaby.com) was a British low-cost airline that flew to destinations in the United Kingdom and Europe from its bases at Birmingham and East Midlands airports. It was a subsidiary of British Midland International, itself wholly owned by International Airlines Group (IAG). Bmibaby's head office was at Donington Hall in Castle Donington, North West Leicestershire, England. Bmibaby held a United Kingdom Civil Aviation Authority Type A Operating Licence, and was permitted to carry passengers, cargo and mail on aircraft with 20 or more seats.

Following the takeover of BMI and its subsidiaries by IAG in April 2012, it was announced on 3 May 2012 that Bmibaby would be shut down in September 2012, with many flights ceasing to operate with effect from 11 June. Bmibaby's final flight, from Málaga to East Midlands, operated on 9 September 2012.

History
The airline was established on 24 January 2002 and began operations on 22 March 2003 with a flight between East Midlands and Málaga.

Continued expansion for the airline led to it opening further bases at Cardiff in October 2002, Manchester in May 2003, Durham Tees Valley in October 2003, Birmingham in January 2005. and Belfast City Airport in March 2012. Insufficient passenger numbers led to the closure of the Durham Tees Valley base in 2006, followed by both Cardiff and Manchester in 2011 to make way for expansion in the Midlands and the new base at Belfast City.

On 1 March 2007, the airline announced an initiative for business travellers with an "only choose what you need" approach, allowing passengers to choose from a range of services such as ticket flexibility, executive lounge access and on-line check in, and only pay for the services they used. The company also announced that BMI's frequent flyers could now gain Diamond Club miles.

By 2007, Bmibaby had nine Boeing 737 aircraft based at East Midlands Airport, making it their biggest base, however in December 2008 the airline announced that it would be suspending five routes from the airport as a result of a reduction in the number of customers booking city-breaks.

Further cuts were announced in November 2009 when it was announced that the fleet would be reduced from 17 to 12 aircraft in 2010, with up to 158 jobs at risk of redundancy. The airline said the action was necessary to stem record losses and that it would focus on growth routes best fit for the business.

In April 2011, Bmibaby announced it would close its bases at Cardiff and Manchester Airports in October 2011 to increase services at Birmingham and East Midlands Airports as well as opening a new base at Belfast City Airport, moving from Belfast International Airport where the airline was based for several years.

In May 2011, Bmibaby launched what it called the first European airline loyalty programme tied into a location-based social network. Passengers use the Gowalla smartphone application at Bmibaby check-in desks to collect points.

On 22 December 2011, IAG announced it had agreed a contract with Lufthansa to buy BMI. The contract allowed for Lufthansa to sell BMI Regional and Bmibaby separately before the completion of the main sale, although the price payable by IAG would be reduced if the airlines were not sold. On 2 February 2012, BMI announced it had signed a "non-binding and non-exclusive" agreement with a "UK-based company", with plans to complete the sale by the summer of 2012. The sale was not completed by the time IAG purchased BMI, and so Bmibaby and BMI Regional became part of the group. IAG said it would continue the attempts to sell both airlines.

However, on 3 May 2012 IAG announced that it had not found a buyer for Bmibaby and that it was proposing to shut down the company by 9 September 2012. Flights to some destinations such as Belfast, Amsterdam, Paris and Geneva ended on 11 June 2012. All remaining services ended by 9 September 2012. The final flight to operate was flight WW5330 from Malaga to East Midlands. Over 800 jobs were lost by the closure, including 400 at the head office in Castle Donington.

After its closure, WOW air took the WW IATA code while the ICAO code BMI remains unused.

Destinations

Fleet 

As of September 2012, the Bmibaby fleet consisted of the following aircraft in an all-economy class configuration:

Several aircraft had names with the word baby in the title. After all flights ceased, the aircraft were placed in storage at Norwich International Airport and Lasham Airfield. The majority of the airline's fleet was leased. As of November 2014, all the fleet had moved on from Bmibaby, one had been scrapped (G-OBMP) and the last one partly remains with some of the fuselage in some trees at Bruntingthorpe (G-BVKB).

Services

Onboard 
Bmibaby offered a buy on board programme with variety of items to purchase including scratch-cards, tax-free shopping and onboard drinks and snacks. The shopping range included items such as jewellery and fragrances, gifts and travel accessories. On non-EU flights, duty-free priced cigarettes and spirits could be purchased. Drinks and snack items included hot and cold drinks, alcoholic and soft drinks as well as crisps, sandwiches and confectionery. The drinks and snack menu was named the Tiny Bites menu. The Bmibaby inflight magazine was known as Yeah baby!

The majority of Bmibaby's cabins had shaded blue leather seating with a 29/30" seat pitch. Extra legroom seats could be found on the front rows and on over-wing exit rows of all the Bmibaby 737 aircraft.

Telephone Booking 
In addition to online booking on the bmibaby.com website; Bmibaby employed 20-30 customer service representatives to take telephone queries and bookings. Prior to November 2005 the team were located in Glasgow. From November 2005, the team was based in Belfast working in the TeleTech customer contact centre. The call centre was then moved to Delhi, India and remained there until the firm's closure in 2012.

See also
 List of defunct airlines of the United Kingdom

References

External links

bmibaby Tribute Video

Defunct airlines of the United Kingdom
Airlines established in 2002
Airlines disestablished in 2012
British companies established in 2002
British companies disestablished in 2012
British Midland International
Companies based in Leicestershire
Defunct European low-cost airlines
European Low Fares Airline Association
North West Leicestershire District
Former Star Alliance affiliate members